Saint-Raphaël is a municipality of about 2,400 people in Bellechasse Regional County Municipality in the Chaudière-Appalaches administrative region of Quebec. It has several small buildings and a very small supermarket.

References

Municipalities in Quebec
Incorporated places in Chaudière-Appalaches